MOS-1 may refer to:
 the first segment of the Newark–Elizabeth Rail Link,  a proposed 8.8-mile (14.2 km)-long light rail line in New Jersey
 MOS-1 (satellite) (Marine Observation Satellite 1), Japan's first Earth observation satellite launched in 1987c&
 Mos 1 transposon (Mosaic element 1), a Tc1/Mariner transposon found in Drosophila mauritiana